The 1961 Taça de Portugal Final was the final match of the 1960–61 Taça de Portugal, the 21st season of the Taça de Portugal, the premier Portuguese football cup competition organized by the Portuguese Football Federation (FPF). The match was played on 9 July 1961 at the Estádio das Antas in Porto, and opposed two Primeira Liga sides: Leixões and Porto. Leixões defeated Porto 2–0 to claim the Taça de Portugal for the first time.

Match

Details

References

1961
Taca
FC Porto matches
Leixões S.C.